An aerostat (via French) is a lighter-than-air aircraft that gains its lift through the use of a buoyant gas. Aerostats include unpowered balloons and powered airships. A balloon may be free-flying or tethered. The average density of the craft is lower than the density of atmospheric air, because its main component is one or more gasbags, a lightweight skin containing a lifting gas (which could be heated air or any gas of lower density than air) to provide buoyancy, to which other components such as a gondola containing equipment or people are attached. Especially with airships, the gasbags are often protected by an outer envelope.

Aerostats are so named because they use aerostatic lift which is a buoyant force that does not require movement through the surrounding air mass, resulting in VTOL ability. This contrasts with the heavy aerodynes that primarily use aerodynamic lift which requires the movement of a wing surface through the surrounding air mass. The term has also been used in a narrower sense, to refer to the statically tethered balloon in contrast to the free-flying airship. This article uses the term in its broader sense. Coc

Terminology

In student usage, the term aerostat refers to any thermostat that remains in the air primarily using aerostatic buoyancy.

Historically, all aerostats were called balloons. Powered types capable of horizontal flight were referred to as dirigible balloons or simply dirigibles (from the French dirigeable meaning steerable). These powered aerostats later came to be called airships, with the term "balloon" reserved for unpowered types, whether tethered or free-floating.

More recently, the US Government Accountability Office has used the term "aerostat" in a different sense, to distinguish the statically tethered balloon from the free-flying airship.

Types

Balloons

A balloon is an unpowered aerostat which has no means of propulsion and must be either tethered on a long cable or allowed to drift freely with the wind.

Although a free balloon travels at the speed of the wind, it is travelling with the wind so to a passenger the air feels calm and windless. To change its altitude above ground it must either adjust the amount of lift or discard ballast weight. Notable uses of free-flying balloons include meteorological balloons and sport balloons.

A tethered balloon is held down by one or more mooring lines or tethers. It has sufficient lift to hold the line taut and its altitude is controlled by winching the line in or out. A tethered balloon does feel the wind. A round balloon is unstable and bobs about in strong winds, so the kite balloon was developed with an aerodynamic shape similar to a non-rigid airship. Both kite balloons and non-rigid airships are sometimes called "blimps". Notable uses of tethered balloons include observation balloons and barrage balloons and notable uses of untethered balloons include espionage balloons and fire balloons.

Airships

An airship is a powered, free-flying aerostat that can be steered. Airships divide into rigid, semi-rigid and non-rigid types, with these last often known as blimps.

A rigid airship has an outer framework or skin surrounding the lifting gas bags inside it, The outer envelope keeps its shape even if the gasbags are deflated. The great zeppelin airships of the twentieth century were rigid types.

A non-rigid airship or blimp deflates like a balloon as it loses gas. The Goodyear blimps are still a common sight in the USA.

A semi-rigid airship has a deflatable gas bag like a non-rigid but with a supporting structure to help it hold its shape while aloft. The first practical airship, the Santos-Dumont No. 6 was a semi-rigid.

Some airships obtain additional lift aerodynamically as they travel through the air, using the shape of their envelope or through the addition of fins or even small wings. Types designed to exploit this lifting effect in normal cruise are called hybrid airships.

Hybrid aerostats
A hybrid type uses both static buoyancy and dynamic airflow to provide lift. The dynamic movement may be created either using propulsive power as a hybrid airship or by tethering in the wind like a kite, as a Helikite or kytoon.

The Allsopp Helikite is a combination of a helium balloon and a kite to form a single, aerodynamically sound tethered aircraft, that exploits both wind and helium for its lift. Helikites are semi-rigid. Helikites are considered the most stable, energy and cost-efficient aerostats available. This gives Helikites various advantages over traditional aerostats. Traditional aerostats need to utilize relatively low-lift helium gas to combat high winds, which means they need to have a lot of gas to cope and so are very large, unwieldy and expensive. Helikites exploit wind lift so they only need to be a fraction of the size of traditional aerostats in order to operate in high winds. Helikites fly many times higher altitude than traditional aerostats of the same size. Being smaller, with fewer construction seams, means Helikites have minimal problems with gas leakage compared to traditional aerostats, so Helikites use far less helium.

Helikites do not need ballonets and so are simpler in construction than traditional aerostats and Helikites do not need constant electrical power to keep them airborne. Helikites are also extremely stable and so are good aerial platforms for cameras or scientific instruments. Tiny Helikites will fly in all weathers, so these sizes are popular as they are very reliable but still easy to handle and do not require large expensive winches. Helikites can be small enough to fit fully inflated in a car but they can also be made large if heavy payloads are required to be flown to high altitudes. Helikites are one of the most popular aerostat designs and are widely used by the scientific community, military, photographers, geographers, police, first responders. Helikites are used by telecoms companies to lift 4G and 5G base stations for areas without cellphone coverage.

Helikites range in size from 1 metre (gas volume 0.13 m3) with a pure helium lift of 30g, up to 14 metres (gas volume 250m3) able to lift 117 kg. Small Helikites can fly up to altitudes of 1,000 ft, and medium-sized Helikites up to altitudes of 13,000 ft, while large Helikites can achieve 7,000 ft.

Piasecki Helicopter developed the Piasecki PA-97 Helistat using the rotor systems from four obsolete helicopters and a surplus Navy blimp, in order to provide a capability to lift heavier loads than a single helicopter could provide. The aircraft suffered a fatal accident during a test flight. In 2008, Boeing and SkyHook International resurrected the concept and announced a proposed design of the SkyHook JHL-40.

Lifting gases

In order to provide buoyancy, any lifting gas must be less dense than the surrounding air. A hot air balloon is open at the bottom to allow hot air to enter, while the gas balloon is closed to stop the (cold) lifting gas from escaping. Common lifting gases have included hydrogen, coal gas and helium.

Hot air
When heated, air expands. This lowers its density and creates lift. Small hot air balloons or lanterns have been flown in China since ancient times. The first modern man-lifting aerostat, made by the Montgolfier brothers, was a hot air balloon. Most early balloons however were gas balloons. Interest in the sport of hot air ballooning reawoke in the second half of the twentieth century and even some hot-air airships have been flown.

Hydrogen
Hydrogen is the lightest of all gases and a manned hydrogen balloon was flown soon after the Montgolfier brothers. There is no need to burn fuel, so a gas balloon can stay aloft far longer than a hot-air balloon. Hydrogen soon became the most common lifting gas for both balloons and, later, airships. But hydrogen itself is flammable and, following several major disasters in the 1930s, it fell out of use.

Coal gas
Coal gas comprises a mix of methane and other gases, and typically has about half the lifting power of hydrogen. In the late nineteenth and early twentieth centuries municipal gas works became common and provided a cheap source of lifting gas. Some works were able to produce a special mix for ballooning events, incorporating a higher proportion of hydrogen and less carbon monoxide, to improve its lifting power.

Helium
Helium is the only lifting gas which is both non-flammable and non-toxic, and it has almost as much (about 92%) lifting power as hydrogen. It was not discovered in quantity until early in the twentieth century, and for many years only the USA had enough to use in airships. Almost all gas balloons and airships now use helium.

Low-pressure gases

Although not currently practical, it may be possible to construct a rigid, lighter-than-air structure which, rather than being inflated with air, is at a vacuum relative to the surrounding air. This would allow the object to float above the ground without any heat or special lifting gas, but the structural challenges of building a rigid vacuum chamber lighter than air are quite significant. Even so, it may be possible to improve the performance of more conventional aerostats by trading gas weight for structural weight, combining the lifting properties of the gas with vacuum and possibly heat for enhanced lift.

See also

References

 https://docs.wixstatic.com/ugd/805773_eba4ea45e5824133ad520da3a14b5b15.pdf

External links

 DJ's Zeppelin page
 "Illustrations of the Five Major Types of Lighter-Than-Air-Aircraft" Popular Mechanics, June 1930
 The principle of a balloon flight – Video – YouTube

 
Balloons (aeronautics)
Unmanned blimps
Aircraft categories